Ian Randle (born 7 July 1949) is a Jamaican publisher. He is the founder of an eponymous independent publishing company whose main focus is on English-language readers. He has won awards including the Prince Claus Award in 2012 and the 2019 Bocas Henry Swanzy Award for distinguished service to Caribbean letter.

Life 
Randle was born in Green Island, Hanover Parish on Jamaica in 1949, the eldest of his parents' three boys and two girls. He studied for a Special Honours degree in history at the Mona campus of the University of the West Indies, Jamaica, and later for an MSc in international politics at the University of Southampton UK on a Commonwealth scholarship. After his academic study he worked many years for British publishers until he set up his own firm, Ian Randle Publishers (IRP), in 1990. This start made him the first English-language publisher of scholarly books in the Caribbean, publishing books on and about the region since 1991. Later, his firm became a model for particularly the African book scene.

Ian Randle Publishers
At first Randle focused on history and the social sciences, which allowed young academics to publish their findings locally. As a result, the region became less dependent on writers from the United Kingdom, the colonizer of Jamaica until 1962. In later years Randle expanded the range of books to include biography, culture, cookery, and sports, while producing texts for undergraduate-level students and the upper levels of the Caribbean secondary school system. His list contains the most comprehensive offerings on the Regional Integration Movement and on the Caribbean Community (CARICOM). His published list contains over 350 printed titles and some electronic editions.

The direction of the firm is now in the hands of Randle's daughter Christine, while he himself has continued in fields such as marketing, public relations and consultancy.

In 2000 Randle helped establish the Caribbean Publishers Network (CAPNET) and became its first president, serving for two two-year terms, during which he established links with the international publishing community and with publishers in Africa through the sister organization APNET. During this period Randle contributed regularly to the University of Denver Publishing Institute delivering the annual lecture on international publishing and presenting papers in a variety of international publishing and education fora.

Recognition 
His pioneering work was recognized by the government of Jamaica when he was conferred with the Order of Distinction in 2002. In 2012 Randle was honoured with a Prince Claus Award from the Netherlands for his contribution to Caribbean intellectual property and for championing independent local publishing and self-representation in other post-colonial contexts. Earlier that year, the Caribbean magazine Tallawah included him on the list of most influential Jamaicans. In 2013 he received an Honorary Doctor of Laws (LLD) degree from the University of the West Indies, St Augustine campus in Trinidad, for his contribution to Trinidad and Tobago and the Caribbean. In the same year, he received the Trailblazers Award from the Book Industry Association of Jamaica.

In March 2019 Randle was announced as the recipient of the Bocas Henry Swanzy Award, which was presented on 5 May 2019 at the NGC Bocas Lit Fest.

References

External links 
Ian Randle Publishers official website
 "2012 Prince Claus Laureate Ian Randle (Jamaica)". YouTube.
 "Ian Randle founder of Ian Randle Publishers", AALBC.com, 27 March 2016 YouTube video.

Jamaican businesspeople
Publishers (people)
Living people
1949 births
People from Hanover Parish
Recipients of the Order of Distinction
20th-century publishers (people)